The 2002 National Hockey League All-Star Game took place on February 2, 2002, at the Staples Center in Los Angeles. The final score was World 8, North America 5.  This was the last NHL All-Star Game to have the North America vs. World All-Star format. It was also the last All-Star Game that was held in the same year as the Winter Olympics until the 2018 edition.

All-Star weekend

NHL YoungStars Game
The inaugural NHL YoungStars Game was played (replacing Heroes of Hockey old-timers game) featuring the future young stars of the NHL.  The two teams were divided between Team Melrose and Team Fox. The game format had four skaters (and one goaltender) per side and the first two periods were for 12 minutes running time, and then the third period would run for 11 minutes, running time, plus a final minute of stop time. The teams were allowed a four-minute break between periods. If the score is tied after three periods, a sudden-murder shootout will determine the winner.  Team Melrose would defeat Team Fox by a score of 13–7, as Atlanta Thrashers' Ilya Kovalchuk would score six goals for Team Melrose, with one of them being on a penalty shot.  Kovalchuk was named as the first-ever YoungStars MVP.

Super Skills Competition
The World All-Stars would win their fourth and last skills competition barely defeating the North American All-Stars by a score of 12–11.  In the individual events, Mighty Ducks of Anaheim' Paul Kariya would win his fourth-straight Puck Control Relay event, while Carolina Hurricanes' Sami Kapanen would win his second Fastest Skater event and Detroit Red Wings' Sergei Fedorov would win his first Hardest Shot event.  Two individual events would be shared as Calgary Flames' Jarome Iginla and Vancouver Canucks' Markus Naslund would share the Accuracy Shooting event title and Colorado Avalanche's Patrick Roy and Detroit Red Wings' Dominik Hasek would win the Goaltenders Competition after the Pass and Score and Breakaway Relay events.

Individual event winners
 Puck Control Relay – Paul Kariya (Mighty Ducks of Anaheim)
 Fastest Skater – Sami Kapanen (Carolina Hurricanes) - 14.039 seconds
 Accuracy Shooting – Jarome Iginla (Calgary Flames)/Markus Naslund (Vancouver Canucks) - 4 hits, 6 shots
 Hardest Shot – Sergei Fedorov (Detroit Red Wings)  - 101.5 mph
 Goaltenders Competition – Patrick Roy (Colorado Avalanche)/Dominik Hasek (Detroit Red Wings) - 1 GA, 9 shots

The game
The 52nd NHL All-Star Game was highlighted by Pittsburgh Penguins' Mario Lemieux's 13th career goal which tied Wayne Gretzky for the most goals scored in All-Star Game competition, Tampa Bay Lightning goalie Nikolai Khabibulin's flawless third period and a flawed MVP selection process.  Three players would put up three-point performances that included North American All-Stars Chicago Blackhawks' leftwinger Eric Daze (2–1–3) and San Jose Sharks' centre Vincent Damphousse (1–2–3), while Vancouver Canucks' left winger Markus Naslund (2–1–3) would be the only player for the World All-Stars to score three points.  The World All-Stars rallied for 5 goals in the third period and a comeback win. Daze who was appearing in his first All-Star Game, was chosen as All-Star MVP, becoming the first Blackhawk player to win the award since 1971 when Bobby Hull won the award. A minor controversy ensued over the MVP selection, as World All-Stars goalie Khabibulin recorded a third period shutout that allowed his team to storm back from 5-3 down. Apparently voting was conducted with about 5 minutes remaining in the game while the North American All-Stars still held the lead. Afterwards the talk in both locker rooms was about the Russian goaltender's play, what it might mean for the upcoming Olympics in two weeks and their disappointment that his 20 save performance didn't win him an honor, which many of them thought was both deserved and obvious.

Uniforms
Continuing from the previous two All-Star Games, the NHL continued to use a color-vs.color format. The North American team's jersey was the same shade of blue as the logo of the Eastern Conference, the same shade of blue previously used by the World team in 1998 and 1999; the jersey also featured the first tie-down collar in the All-Star Game since 1970. The World team used the Western Conference's burgundy color, and a unique horizontal-cut collar. Both uniforms featured predominantly black trim with silver and white accents, and a scooped hemline that would become prevalent with the Reebok Edge and Adidas ADIZERO uniform systems. Although the game was hosted by the Kings, the name and number fonts used on the All-Star jerseys were similar to those used by the Nashville Predators.

Due to complaints about the uniforms being too dark and lacking sufficient contrast to each other, the NHL would replace the burgundy jersey with a white one in the next year's game.

Summary

 Referees: Dave Jackson, Don Van Massenhoven
 Linesmen: Andy McElman, Mark Pare
 Television: ABC, CBC, SRC

Rosters

Notes
1.Eric Lindros was selected, but was unable to play due to injury. Mike York was selected as his replacement.
2.Brian Rafalski was selected, but was unable to play due to injury. Chris Chelios was selected as his replacement.
3.Jere Lehtinen was selected, but was unable to play due to injury. Espen Knutsen was named as his replacement.

References

See also
2001–02 NHL season

All
National Hockey League All-Star Games
Ice hockey competitions in Los Angeles
2002 in Los Angeles